This is a list of wars occurring on the island of Great Britain.

See also
List of wars in Ireland
List of wars involving England
List of battles involving the Kingdom of Scotland
List of wars involving the United Kingdom
List of English civil wars
Military history of England
Military history of Scotland
Military history of the United Kingdom

References

Great Britain
 
 
Wars
 

 
Wars